Krasna Talivka is a land border crossing between Ukraine and Russia on the Ukrainian side, near the village of Krasna Talivka, Shchastia Raion, Luhansk Oblast.

The crossing is situated on highway . Across the border on the Russian side is the village of Voloshinoye, Millerovsky District, Rostov Oblast.

The type of crossing is automobile only, status - international and local. The types of transportation for automobile crossings are passenger and freight.

The port of entry is part of the Krasna Talivka customs post of Luhansk customs.

See also
 Russia–Ukraine border
 State Border of Ukraine

References

External links
 State Border Guard of Ukraine website 

Shchastia Raion
Russia–Ukraine border crossings